Bahadir Incilli (born 25 August 1989 in Köln) is a German football player, who currently plays for 1. FC Monheim.

Career 
Incilli began his career with SCB Viktoria Köln and signed 2004 for rival VfL Leverkusen. After four years with VfL Leverkusen 04/14 e. V., signed in summer 2008 for Wuppertaler SV Borussia II. On 21 April 2010 made his professional debut for the Wuppertaler SV in the 3rd Liga against VfB Stuttgart II. He signed on 24 May 2010 a one-year contract with FC Schalke 04 and left the reserve team of Wuppertaler SV Borussia. After just a half year with FC Schalke 04 II
 joined on 21 January 2011 to Fortuna Düsseldorf.

References

External links
Bahadir Incilli at FuPa

1989 births
Living people
German footballers
Footballers from Cologne
Fortuna Düsseldorf II players
FC Schalke 04 II players
Wuppertaler SV players
3. Liga players
Association football defenders